Yapunda, or Yeri, is a Torricelli language of Papua New Guinea.

References

Further reading 
 

Wapei languages
Languages of Sandaun Province